Robert Hermes, DVM, Ph.D.(born November 15, 1969 in Celle, Germany) is a veterinarian researcher at The Leibniz-Institute of Zoo and Wildlife Research in Berlin. He studied veterinary medicine at the Freie Universität Berlin. He completed a Ph.D. in reproductive management.

Research
Hermes was a member of the Indianapolis Zoo team, that accomplished the world’s first successful artificial insemination of an African elephant. He completed a  postdoctoral research project concentrated on the reproductive management of African elephants. Hermes is a researcher at The Leibniz Institute for Zoo and Wildlife Research(IZW), in the department of reproductive management. His research concentrates on the reproductive management of elephants and rhinoceros. Hermes has supervised doctoral candidates researching reproductive management in a variety of animal species.

Hermes is an integral member of the eminent IZW researchers in animal reproductive management. Dr. Thomas Bernd Hildebrandt, head of the IZW Department of Reproductive Management, is internationally recognized as the leader in elephant reproductive research. Dr. Hermes, Dr. Hildebrandt, Dr. Frank Goeritz of the IZW have served  for several years as reproductive consultants for the Pittsburgh Zoo. The Pittsburgh Zoo & PPG Aquariam (PZ) and Leibniz Institute for Zoo and Wildlife Research (Berlin, Germany) have in joint partnership conducted collaborative research on elephant reproduction. Dr. Hermes is an internationally recognized wildlife reproduction expert and  researcher.

References
Babar on Ice: A New Way to Save Endangered Elephants? Scientific American, January 12, 2009
 Hermes, Robert, 1998. Ultrasonography as a tool for monitoring pregnancy in roe deer (Capreolus capreolus) and quantification of the endometrial echotexture during embryonic diapause using computer-assisted greyscale analysis, Ph.D thesis, Fachbereich Veterinärmedizin, Freie Universität Berlin
Robert Hermes, Frank Göritz, J. Saragusty, E. Sós, V. Molnar, C.E. Reid, Franz Schwarzenberger, Thomas B. Hildebrandt. First successful artificial insemination with frozen-thawed semen in rhinoceros, Theriogenology, An International Journal of Animal Reproduction, Volume 71, Issue 3, Pages 393-399 (February 2009)
Thomas Hildebrandt, Barbara Drews, Ann P.Gaeth, Frank Goeritz, Robert Hermes, Dennis Schmitt, Charlie Gray, Peter Rich, Wolf Juergen Streich, Roger V. Short, and Marilyn B. Renfree. Foetal age determination and development in elephants, Proc Biol Sci. 7 February 2007; 274(1608): 323–331.
Robert Hermes, Deborah Olson , Frank Göritz , Janine L. Brown, Dennis L. Schmitt, David Hagan, Jeffrey S. Peterson , Guido Fritsch , Thomas B. Hildebrandt Ultrasonography of the estrous cycle in female African elephants (Loxodonta africana.) Zoo Biology,  Volume 19, Issue 5 , Pages 369 - 382

External links
The Leibniz-Institute for Zoo and Wildlife Research
Artificial Insemination of Captive Elephants
 BBC Horizon-The Elephant's Guide to Sex, Video interview
BBC News-Pulling Species from the Brink
High-tech egg hunt in the race to save the rhino-Sydney Morning Herald
Last Hope for Vanishing White Rhinos- The Guardian
Melbourne Zoo's super-stud could help save species- WAtoday.com.au
Birth of White Rhino After Artificial Insemination with Frozen Sperm

Living people
German veterinarians
People from Celle
Free University of Berlin alumni
German conservationists
1969 births